Yonatan Goitum is an Eritrean footballer. He played for the Eritrea national football team.

International career
Goitum played in the 2009 CECAFA Cup in Kenya, providing the assist for the second Eritrean goal in the 3-1 victory against Somalia.

Personal life
Whilst competing in the 2009 CECAFA Cup in Kenya he was part of the Eritrea national football team which failed to return home after competing in the regional tournament in Nairobi. After receiving refugee status from the Australian government, the team moved to Adelaide, Australia.

References

External links

Living people
Eritrean footballers
Eritrea international footballers
Association football midfielders
Year of birth missing (living people)
Eritrean refugees
Sportspeople from Asmara